Omartian is a surname. Notable people with the surname include:

Michael Omartian (born 1945), Armenian-American musician
Paige Omartian (born 1990), American singer-songwriter
Stormie Omartian (born 1942), American writer, wife of Michael

Armenian-language surnames